The Ira A. Fulton Schools of Engineering (often abbreviated to the Fulton Schools) is the engineering college of Arizona State University.  The Fulton Schools offers 25 undergraduate and 48 graduate degree programs in all major engineering disciplines, construction and computer science. In 2023 the Fulton Schools became the first university in the nation to offer a bachelor's degree, master's degree and doctoral degree in manufacturing engineering.

The Fulton Schools comprises seven engineering schools located on both ASU's Tempe and Polytechnic campuses. The seven schools include the following:
 School of Biological and Health Systems Engineering
 School of Computing and Augmented Intelligence
 School of Electrical, Computer and Energy Engineering
 School for Engineering of Matter, Transport and Energy
 School of Manufacturing Systems and Networks
 School of Sustainable Engineering and the Built Environment
 The Polytechnic School

The Global School, not an official Fulton School, refers to the Fulton Schools’ collective efforts in engaging in a globally-connected network of higher education initiatives and collaborations with government entities to broaden access to engineering education and build partnerships (in development).

History

The Ira A. Fulton Schools of Engineering began in 1954 as the College of Applied Arts and Sciences. In 1956, the first bachelor's degree program in engineering was approved. The School of Engineering was created in 1958. In 1970, the Division of Construction was added.
 
In 1992, through a gift of the Del E. Webb Foundation, an endowment was set up to create the Del E. Webb School of Construction, which offers undergraduate and graduate construction and construction management programs. It is now a part of the  School of Sustainable Engineering and the Built Environment. 
A separate school was created for technology programs and, in 1996, the Schools of Technology and Agribusiness moved to the Polytechnic Campus.
 
In 2002, the Department of Bioengineering was renamed the Harrington Department of Bioengineering in honor of a $5 million gift from the Harrington Arthritis Research Center. The department is now one of the seven Fulton Schools, the School of Biological and Health Systems Engineering.
 
Also in 2002, the office of Global Outreach and Executive Education (GOEE) was established to provide anytime/anyplace learning environments for industry professionals to complete advanced degrees. In 2003, the program began offering engineering graduate degrees completely online. Currently, GOEE offers 16 online undergraduate engineering/technology degree programs, 17 online master's degree programs, and one online master's program for students in China. GOEE also offers three graduate-level academic certificate programs.
 
In 2003, Ira A. Fulton, founder and CEO of Fulton Homes, established an endowment of $50 million in support of ASU's College of Engineering and Applied Sciences, which was renamed in his honor. The new Ira A. Fulton Schools of Engineering was reconstructed to include five separate and interdisciplinary schools: The School of Biological and Health Systems Engineering; the School of Computing, Informatics and Decision Systems Engineering; the School of Electrical, Computer and Energy Engineering; the School for Engineering of Matter, Transport and Energy; and the School of Sustainable Engineering and the Built Environment.
 
Since receiving this transformational gift, the Ira A. Fulton Schools of Engineering have grown in enrollment, programs offered and research expenditures. Between 2015 and 2019, research expenditures rose from $89 million to $115 million.
 
In 2014, the College of Technology and Innovation on ASU's Polytechnic campus was renamed The Polytechnic School and became the sixth school in the Fulton Schools.

In August 2021, the Ira A. Fulton Schools of Engineering introduced the seventh Fulton School, the School of Manufacturing Systems and Networks (MSN) on the Polytechnic campus. At the same time, the School of Computing, Informatics, and Decision Systems Engineering was renamed the School of Computing and Augmented Intelligence (SCAI).
 
Fall 2022 enrollment (21st day census) in the Fulton Schools was 30,297 students total (undergraduate and graduate).

The Fulton Schools employ 390 tenured/tenure-track faculty and have $145 million in research expenditures (FY 2022).

In January of 2023, the Fulton Schools announced the core values that define the organization. The Fulton Schools values are to:
 Cultivate excellence
 Deliver innovation that matters
 Encourage bold thinking
 Foster a community of learning and collaboration
 Build a foundation for all to be successful

Location
The Fulton Schools administrative offices and some departments are located within The Brickyard building complex on Mill Avenue in downtown Tempe, Arizona. 

The Fulton Schools has more than 1,000,000 square feet of space in over a dozen buildings on ASU's Tempe and Polytechnic campuses. Degree programs are offered in-person on both the Tempe campus and the Polytechnic campus (Mesa, Arizona), and online at ASU Online.

In September 2014, The College Avenue Commons building was opened as the new home of the School of Sustainable Engineering and the Built Environment, including the Del E. Webb School of Construction (DEWSC). DEWSC students, faculty and alumni contributed to the design and construction of the building, which features some exposed construction elements which allow it to be used as a teaching tool. Like many ASU and Fulton Schools buildings, it is Leadership in Energy and Environmental Design (LEED) Gold certified.

In August 2017, The Fulton Schools opened Tooker House, a residential community “built for engineers.” Tooker House is a 1,600-person, co-ed residential community for Fulton Schools undergraduate students and features on-site digital classrooms and state-of-the-art makerspaces.

Notable faculty

National Academy of Sciences 
 Alexandra Navrotsky, Professor, School for Engineering of Matter, Transport and Energy

National Academy of Engineering 
 Ronald Adrian - Regents Professor, School for Engineering of Matter, Transport and Energy
 Dimitri Bertsekas - Professor, School of Computing and Augmented Intelligence 
 Gerald T. Heydt - Regents Professor, School of Electrical, Computer and Energy Engineering
 Edward Kavazanjian - Regents Professor, School of Sustainable Engineering and the Built Environment
 Subhash Mahajan (emeritus) - Regents Professor, School for Engineering of Matter, Transport and Energy)
 Bruce Rittmann - Regents Professor, School of Sustainable Engineering and the Built Environment
 John Undrill - Research Professor, School of Electrical, Computer and Energy Engineering
 Vijay Vittal - Regents Professor, School of Electrical, Computer and Energy Engineering

National Academy of Inventors

Senior Members 
 James Abbas - 2020, Associate Professor, Biological and Health Systems Engineering
 David Allee - 2018, Professor, School of Electrical, Computer and Energy
 Terry Alford - 2019, Professor, School for Engineering of Matter, Transport and Energy
 Zhaoyang Fan - 2018, Professor, School of Electrical, Computer and Energy Engineering
 Erica Forzani - 2021, Associate Professor, School for Engineering of Matter, Transport and Energy
 Cody Friesen - Associate Professor, School for Engineering of Matter, Transport and Energy
 Andreas Spanias - 2019, Professor, School of Electrical, Computer and Energy Engineering
 Sarma Vrudhula - 2020, Professor, School of Computing and Augmented Intelligence

Fellows 
 Michael Kozicki - 2014, Professor, School of Electrical, Computer and Energy Engineering
 Deirdre Meldrum - 2017, Distinguished Professor of Biosignatures Discovery, School of Electrical, Computer and Energy Engineering
 Nathan Newman - 2018, Lawrence Professor of Solid State Sciences, School for Engineering of Matter, Transport and Energy
 Sethuraman Panchanathan - 2013, Professor, School of Computing and Augmented Intelligence
 Bruce Rittmann - 2016, Regents Professor, School of Sustainable Engineering and the Built Environment
Hao Yan - 2022, Assistant Professor, School of Computing and Augmented Intelligence

Regents Professors 
The title “Regents Professor” is the highest faculty honor awarded at Arizona State University. It is conferred on ASU faculty who have made pioneering contributions in their areas of expertise, who have achieved a sustained level of distinction, and who enjoy national and international recognition for these accomplishments.
 Ronald Adrian - 2012–2013, School for Engineering of Matter, Transport and Energy 
 Constantine A. Balanis - 1991–1992, School of Electrical, Computer and Energy Engineering
 Aditi Chattopadhyay - 2013–2014, Mechanical & Aerospace Engineering
 David K. Ferry - 1988–1989, School of Electrical, Computer and Energy Engineering
 Gerald T. Heydt - 2002–2003, School of Electrical, Computer and Energy Engineering
 Edward Kavazanjian - 2014–2015, School of Sustainable Engineering and the Built Environment
 Ying-Cheng Lai - 2021-2022, School of Electrical, Computer and Energy Engineering
 Jerry Lin - 2011–2012, School for Engineering of Matter, Transport and Energy
 Huan Liu - 2022-2023, School of Computing and Augmented Intelligence
 Subhash Mahajan - 2006–2007, School for Engineering of Matter, Transport and Energy
 James W. Mayer, 1994–1995, School for Engineering of Matter, Transport and Energy
 Darryl E. Metzger, 1992-1993, School for Engineering of Matter, Transport and Energy
 Douglas Montgomery - 2005–2006, School of Computing and Augmented Intelligence
 Alexandra Navrotsky - 2022-2023, School for Engineering of Matter, Transport and Energy
 Bruce Rittmann - 2008–2009, School of Sustainable Engineering and the Built Environment
 Dieter Schroeder - 2008–2009, School of Electrical, Computer and Energy Engineering
 Vijay Vittal - 2019–2020, School of Electrical, Computer and Energy Engineering
 Paul Westerhoff - 2016–2017, School of Sustainable Engineering and the Built Environment

Schools 

 School of Biological and Health Systems Engineering 
 School of Computing and Augmented Intelligence (formerly the School of Computing, Informatics, and Decision Systems Engineering)
 School of Electrical, Computer and Energy Engineering
 School for Engineering of Matter, Transport and Energy
 School of Manufacturing Systems and Networks
 School of Sustainable Engineering and the Built Environment
 The Polytechnic School

In addition, The Fulton Schools engage in a globally-connected network of higher education initiatives and collaborations with government entities to provide greater access to engineering education. This set of initiatives is called The Global School.

Rankings

U.S. News & World Report Rankings

 #33 Undergraduate Program [#19 among public institutions] 2023 edition, published September 2022
 #40 Graduate Program [#22 among public institutions] 2023 edition, published March 2022
 #15 Online Master's in Engineering Programs January 2023
 #10 Online Master's in Engineering Programs for Veterans January 2023

U.S. News & World Report Graduate School Specialty Rankings
U.S. News & World Report Graduate School Specialty Rankings 2023 edition, published March 2023, unless otherwise indicated 

 #27 Aerospace 
 #54 Bioengineering 
 #48 Chemical
 #30 Civil
 #27 Computer Engineering
 #43 Computer Science‡ 2020 edition, published March 2019
 #34 Electrical 
 #2 Electrical, Online Master's Program, January 2023
 #3 Engineering Management, Online Master's Program, January 2023
 #16 Environmental 
 #18 Industrial 
 #6 Industrial, Online Master's Program, January 2023
 #35 Materials 
 #41 Mechanical
 
‡According to U.S. News & World Report the Sciences, including Computer Science, are not ranked every year.

U.S. News & World Report Undergraduate Engineering Program Rankings (for schools with doctorate programs)
U.S. News & World Report, 2023 edition, published September 2022
 #18	Civil
 #23	Computer engineering
 #20    Cybersecurity (computer science specialty, see below)
 #20	Electrical
 #21	Environmental
 #23	Mechanical

U.S. News & World Report Undergraduate Computer Science Program Rankings
U.S. News & World Report, 2023 edition, published September 2022
 #46	Overall
 #20	Cybersecurity

American Society for Engineering Education (ASEE) Standings
Source:

ASEE Engineering Standings
 #6	Bachelor's Degrees Awarded (404 schools included)
 #12  Bachelor's Degrees Awarded to Women (404 schools included)
 #10	Bachelor's Degrees Awarded to Hispanics by school (404 schools included)
 #2	Master's Degrees awarded to Underrepresented Minorities (404 schools included)
 #5	Master's Degrees Awarded by school (404 schools included)
 #16 Doctoral Degrees Awarded by school (404 schools included)
 #2	Graduate Enrollment by school (50 schools included)
 #11 Tenured and Tenure-Track Faculty Members (301 schools included)
 #11 Female Tenured/Tenure-Track Faculty (301 schools included)
 #12 Hispanic Tenured/Tenure-Track Faculty (301 schools included)
 #28 Research Expenditures by Institutions (215 schools included)

ASEE Engineering Technology Standings
 #1 Engineering Technology Enrollment (122 schools reported)
 #2 Engineering Technology bachelor's degrees Awarded by School (122 schools reported)
 #2 Engineering Technology Degrees Awarded to Women by School (122 schools reported)
 #1 Engineering Technology Degrees awarded to Underrepresented Minorities (122 schools included)

References

Arizona State University
Engineering schools and colleges in the United States
Engineering universities and colleges in Arizona
Educational institutions established in 1954
1954 establishments in Arizona